Linda Kisabaka (born 9 April 1969 in Wuppertal) is a retired German middle distance runner. She ran the 400 metres until 1996, when she began specialising in the 800 metres. She retired in 2001, having represented the sports clubs Bayer 04 Leverkusen and LAZ Leipzig during her active career.

Her personal best time is 1:58.24 minutes, achieved in August 1996 in Zürich. The same year she won a bronze medal in the 4 × 400 metres relay at the 1996 Summer Olympics in Atlanta, with teammates Uta Rohländer, Anja Rücker and Grit Breuer.

Achievements

References

External links 
 

1969 births
Living people
Sportspeople from Wuppertal
German female middle-distance runners
German female sprinters
German national athletics champions
German sportspeople of Democratic Republic of the Congo descent
Athletes (track and field) at the 1992 Summer Olympics
Athletes (track and field) at the 1996 Summer Olympics
Olympic athletes of Germany
Olympic bronze medalists for Germany
Olympic bronze medalists in athletics (track and field)
Universiade medalists in athletics (track and field)
Universiade silver medalists for West Germany
Medalists at the 1996 Summer Olympics
Medalists at the 1989 Summer Universiade
Olympic female sprinters